The 1983 Canarian regional election was held on Sunday, 8 May 1983, to elect the 1st Parliament of the Autonomous Community of the Canary Islands. All 60 seats in the Parliament were up for election. The election was held simultaneously with regional elections in twelve other autonomous communities and local elections all throughout Spain.

The Spanish Socialist Workers' Party (PSOE) emerged as the largest party in the archipelago with 27 seats—4 short of an overall majority—following the disintegration and dissolution of the Union of the Democratic Centre (UCD), the former ruling party of Spain in the 1977–1982 period which had achieved virtually unopposed victories in the islands in the 1977 and 1979 general elections. The People's Coalition, an electoral alliance comprising the People's Alliance (AP), the People's Democratic Party (PDP) and the Liberal Union (UL) became the second largest party and the main opposition force in the Parliament with 17 seats, while the also-nationwide Communist Party of Spain (PCE) obtained 1 seat. The centre and centre-right vote became further split between several small parties and splits from the UCD, such as the Democratic and Social Centre (CDS) of former Spanish prime minister Adolfo Suárez, which entered Parliament with 6 seats; the Gomera Group of Independents (AGI), with 2 seats; or the Canarian Nationalist Convergence (CNC) and the Independent Herrenian Group (AHI) with 1 seat each.

The election resulted in the most fragmented regional assembly of those elected on 8 May, with nine parties represented in the Parliament. The PSOE candidate Jerónimo Saavedra, who had been elected as provisional president in December 1982, was able to get re-elected with the support of AM, AGI and AHI, though the party did not commit itself to a global agreement with any other political force.

Overview

Electoral system
The Parliament of the Canary Islands was the devolved, unicameral legislature of the autonomous community of the Canary Islands, having legislative power in regional matters as defined by the Spanish Constitution and the Canarian Statute of Autonomy, as well as the ability to vote confidence in or withdraw it from a regional president.

Transitory Provision First of the Statute established a specific electoral procedure for the first election to the Parliament of the Canary Islands, to be supplemented by the provisions within Royal Decree-Law 20/1977, of 18 March, and its related regulations. Voting for the Parliament was on the basis of universal suffrage, which comprised all nationals over 18 years of age, registered in the Canary Islands and in full enjoyment of their political rights. The 60 members of the Parliament of the Canary Islands were elected using the D'Hondt method and a closed list proportional representation, with an electoral threshold of 20 percent of valid votes—which included blank ballots—being applied in each constituency. Alternatively, parties could also enter the seat distribution as long as they reached three percent regionally. Seats were allocated to constituencies, corresponding to the islands of El Hierro, Fuerteventura, Gran Canaria, La Gomera, La Palma, Lanzarote and Tenerife, with each being allocated a fixed number of seats: 3 for El Hierro, 7 for Fuerteventura, 15 for Gran Canaria, 4 for La Gomera, 8 for La Palma, 8 for Lanzarote and 15 for Tenerife.

The electoral law allowed for parties and federations registered in the interior ministry, coalitions and groupings of electors to present lists of candidates. Parties and federations intending to form a coalition ahead of an election were required to inform the relevant Electoral Commission within fifteen days of the election call, whereas groupings of electors needed to secure the signature of at least one-thousandth of the electorate in the constituencies for which they sought election—with a compulsory minimum of 500 signatures—disallowing electors from signing for more than one list of candidates.

Election date
The Government of Spain, in coordination with the Junta of the Canary Islands, was required to call an election to the Parliament of the Canary Islands within from 1 February to 31 May 1983. In the event of an investiture process failing to elect a regional president within a two-month period from the first ballot, the Parliament was to be automatically dissolved and a snap election called, with elected deputies merely serving out what remained of their four-year terms.

Parliamentary composition
The first election to the Parliament of the Canary Islands was officially called on 10 March 1983, after the publication of the election Decree in the Official State Gazette, with the mandate of the Provisional Parliament ending on 8 May. The table below shows the composition of the parliamentary groups in the Provisional Parliament at the time of its expiry.

Opinion polls
The tables below list opinion polling results in reverse chronological order, showing the most recent first and using the dates when the survey fieldwork was done, as opposed to the date of publication. Where the fieldwork dates are unknown, the date of publication is given instead. The highest percentage figure in each polling survey is displayed with its background shaded in the leading party's colour. If a tie ensues, this is applied to the figures with the highest percentages. The "Lead" column on the right shows the percentage-point difference between the parties with the highest percentages in a poll.

Voting intention estimates
The table below lists weighted voting intention estimates. Refusals are generally excluded from the party vote percentages, while question wording and the treatment of "don't know" responses and those not intending to vote may vary between polling organisations. When available, seat projections determined by the polling organisations are displayed below (or in place of) the percentages in a smaller font; 31 seats were required for an absolute majority in the Parliament of the Canary Islands.

Voting preferences
The table below lists raw, unweighted voting preferences.

Results

Overall

Distribution by constituency

Aftermath

Notes

References
Opinion poll sources

Other

1983 in the Canary Islands
Canary Islands
Regional elections in the Canary Islands
May 1983 events in Europe